Julie Adams (born Betty May Adams; October 17, 1926 – February 3, 2019) was an American actress, billed as Julia Adams toward the beginning of her career, primarily known for her numerous television guest roles. She starred in a number of films in the 1950s, including Bend of the River (1952), opposite James Stewart; and Creature from the Black Lagoon (1954). On television, she was known for her roles as Paula Denning on the 1980s soap opera Capitol, and Eve Simpson on Murder, She Wrote.

Early years
Julie Adams was born as Betty May Adams on October 17, 1926, in Waterloo, Iowa, the daughter of Arkansas-born parents Esther Gertrude (Beckett) and Ralph Adams, who was a cotton buyer. Her family moved a great deal; the longest she lived in one town was eight years in Blytheville, Arkansas. In 1946, at the age of 19, she was crowned "Miss Little Rock" and then moved to Hollywood, California to pursue her acting career. Adams worked as a part-time secretary and began her film career in B movie westerns.

Career

Film
She used her real name until 1949, when she began working for Universal-International, the same studio where she met future stars such as James Best, Piper Laurie, Rock Hudson and Tony Curtis. She then became "Julia" and eventually "Julie". In 1954, she explained the latter change, "The studio picked Julia, but I never have felt comfortable with it. I just like the name Julie better, and the studio has given me permission to make the change."

Her first movie role was a minor part in Red, Hot and Blue (1949),  followed by a leading role in the Lippert western The Dalton Gang (1949). Adams was featured as the beautiful ichthyologist Kay Lawrence in the science-fiction film Creature from the Black Lagoon (1954).

She co-starred in 1950s films opposite some of Hollywood's top leading men, including with James Stewart in 1952's Bend of the River, with Rock Hudson in The Lawless Breed (1953) and One Desire (1955), with Tyrone Power in The Mississippi Gambler (1953), with Glenn Ford in The Man from the Alamo (1953), with Charlton Heston in The Private War of Major Benson (1955), with Dan Duryea in Slaughter on Tenth Avenue (1957) and with Joel McCrea in The Gunfight at Dodge City (1959).

Adams co-starred with Rory Calhoun, known for his role in How to Marry a Millionaire (1953), in the film The Looters (1955), the story of a plane crash in the Rocky Mountains. Part of the picture was filmed about Tarryall Creek at what is now Eleven Mile State Park in Park County in central Colorado. The advertising poster reads: "Five desperate men ... and a girl who didn't care ... trapped on a mountain of gale-lashed rock!"

She also starred in 1957's Four Girls in Town, a romantic comedy about four young women competing for the leading role in a new movie, featuring an international cast. She appeared with Elvis Presley in the musical-comedy Tickle Me  (1965). Adams thought highly of her co-star, noting: "Despite his status as a superstar singer and stage performer, Elvis took his acting very seriously. He was always prepared, and did a good job in the roles he was given. When he did his musical numbers in Tickle Me, sometimes walking from table to table in a nightclub set, he did them perfectly in one take."

Television

On television, Adams appeared on The Andy Griffith Show portraying Mary Simpson, a county nurse and romantic interest of Sheriff Andy Taylor in a 1962 episode. She also made four guest appearances on Perry Mason, perhaps the most notable being the 1963 episode, "The Case of the Deadly Verdict," when she played Janice Barton, Mason's only convicted client during the show's nine-year run on CBS. In 1963, she starred in "The Case Of Lovers Leap." In 1964, she played Janice Blake in "The Case of the Missing Button." In 1965, she played the role of defendant Pat Kean in "The Case of the Fatal Fortune." Adams appeared on The Rifleman as a dubious vixen and romantic interest of lead character Chuck Connors. She guest-starred in five episodes of 77 Sunset Strip, three of Alfred Hitchcock Presents, and two of Maverick, "The White Widow" and "The Brasada Spur", both with Jack Kelly as Bart Maverick.

More guest-star roles in popular television series followed, including One Step Beyond, The Big Valley, in its classic episode "The Emperor of Rice", McMillan & Wife, Police Woman, The Streets of San Francisco, The Incredible Hulk, Cannon, Quincy, M.E., and Cagney & Lacey. Adams co-starred with James Stewart in all 24 episodes of The Jimmy Stewart Show on NBC in 1971–1972. Stewart played a professor, and Adams played his wife. She was cast in the recurring role of real estate agent Eve Simpson for ten episodes of CBS's Murder, She Wrote.

Appearances
Adams joined three other cast members from Creature from the Black Lagoon for a 50th anniversary celebration of the film at Creaturefest in November 2003. The festival was held at Wakulla Springs, just south of Tallahassee, Florida, where underwater scenes were filmed in 1953.

In August 2012, she was a guest of honor at the Los Angeles Comic Book and Science Fiction Convention held at the Shrine Auditorium. (She attended the same convention in May 2012.) She also appeared at the CineCon Classic Film Festival on August 31, 2012, at the Loews Hollywood Hotel. She was a scheduled guest at The Hollywood Show in Chicago from September 7–9, 2012. An additional book signing was held at Century Books in Pasadena, California, on September 20, 2012. On October 13, 2012, she was back in Berwyn, Illinois for a book signing party.

In October 2012, the Academy of Motion Picture Arts and Sciences selected Creature from the Black Lagoon as one of 13 classic horror films to screen to honor the 100th anniversary of Universal Pictures. The film was shown (in 3D format) on October 16 at the Samuel Goldwyn Theater in Beverly Hills, California. After the screening, Adams appeared on stage for a Q&A session where she shared personal memories of her role in the film, as well as several other career projects on which she had worked.

Personal life and death
Adams was married to screenwriter Leonard B. Stern from 1951 to 1953. She was then married to actor-director Ray Danton from 1954 until their divorce in 1981. They had two sons: Steven Danton, an assistant director, and Mitchell Danton, a film editor.

Adams died on February 3, 2019, in Los Angeles, California, aged 92.

Awards
In 1999, Adams received a Golden Boot award for her work in Westerns. She was inducted into the Arkansas Entertainers Hall of Fame in 2000. At CineCon in 2011, Adams was honored with a Film Career Achievement Award. In 2012, she won the Rondo Award for the Monster Kid Hall of Fame at the annual Wonderfest in Louisville, Kentucky.

Selected filmography

Your Show Time (1949, TV series) .... (as Betty Adams)
Red, Hot and Blue (1949) .... Starlet (uncredited)
The Dalton Gang (1949) .... Polly Medford
Hostile Country (1950) .... Ann Green
Marshal of Heldorado (1950) .... Ann (as Betty Adams)
Crooked River (1950) .... Ann Hayden (as Betty Adams)
Colorado Ranger (1950) .... Ann (as Betty Adams)
West of the Brazos (1950) .... Ann Greene
Fast on the Draw (1950) .... Ann
For Heaven's Sake (1950) .... Joe's Mother (scenes deleted)
Bright Victory (1951) .... Chris Paterson (as Julia Adams)
Hollywood Story (1951) .... Sally Rousseau / Amanda Rousseau (as Julia Adams)
Finders Keepers (1951) .... Sue Kipps
Bend of the River (1952) .... Laura Baile (as Julia Adams)
The Treasure of Lost Canyon (1952) .... Myra Wade (as Julia Adams)
Horizons West (1952) .... Lorna Hardin (as Julia Adams)
The Lawless Breed (1952) .... Rosie McCoy (as Julia Adams)
The Mississippi Gambler (1953) .... Ann Conant (as Julia Adams)
The Man from the Alamo (1953) .... Beth Anders (as Julia Adams)
The Stand at Apache River (1953) .... Valerie Kendrick
Wings of the Hawk (1953) .... Raquel Noriega (as Julia Adams)
Creature from the Black Lagoon (1954) .... Kay Lawrence (credited as Julia Adams)
Francis Joins the WACS (1954) .... Capt. Jane Parker
Six Bridges to Cross (1955) .... Ellen Gallagher
The Looters (1955) .... Sheryl Gregory (as Julie Adams)
One Desire (1955) .... Judith Watrous (credited as Julia Adams)
Lux Video Theatre (1955–1957, TV series) .... Catherine / Henrietta Smith / Jane
The Private War of Major Benson (1956) .... Dr. Kay Lambert
Studio One (1956, TV series) .... Anne
Away All Boats (1956) .... Nadine MacDougall
Four Girls in Town (1957) .... Kathy Conway
Slaughter on Tenth Avenue (1957) .... Daisy 'Dee' Pauley
Climax! (1957, TV series) .... Coleen
Slim Carter (1957) .... Clover Doyle
Playhouse 90 (1958, TV series) .... Janice Ohringer
Yancy Derringer (1958) .... Amanda Eaton
Tarawa Beachhead (1958) .... Ruth Campbell	
Zane Grey Theatre (1958, TV series) .... Julie Brand
Goodyear Theatre (1958–1960, TV series) .... Betty Fordham / Marion Ewell
Alfred Hitchcock Presents (1958–1961, TV series) .... Phyllis Kendall / Peg Valence / Carol Longsworth
Letter to Loretta ('The Loretta Young Show') (1958, TV series) .... Milly / Paula McGill
Alcoa Presents: One Step Beyond (1959, TV series) ('Epilogue', episode) .... Helen Archer
The Gunfight at Dodge City (1959) .... Pauline Howard
The Man and the Challenge (1959, TV series) .... Linda Webb
The Alaskans (1959, TV series) .... Clara
Maverick (1959–1960, TV series) .... Wilma White / Belle Morgan
77 Sunset Strip (1959–1964, TV series) .... Anne Kenzie / Norma Kellogg / Miriam Galbraith / Marie La Shelle / Margot Wendice
Cheyenne (1960, TV series) .... Irene Travers
The Rifleman (1960, TV series) .... Nora Sanford
Tate (1960, TV series) .... Mary Hardin
Raymie (1960) .... Helen
Markham (1960, TV series) .... Stacey Winters
Wrangler (1960, TV series) .... Eve Browning
Michael Shayne (1960, TV series) .... Beatrice Drake
Hawaiian Eye (1960–1961, TV series) .... Gloria Matthews / Sara Crane
Checkmate (1960–1962, TV series) .... Jean Damion / Janet Evans
Bonanza (1961, Episode: "The Courtship") .... Helen Layton
Outlaws (1961, TV series) .... Juill Ramsur
Surfside 6 (1961, TV series) .... Julie Owens / Merilee Williams
The Andy Griffith Show (1962, TV series) .... Mary Simpson
The Dick Powell Show (1962, TV series) .... Robin
Dr. Kildare (1962, TV series) .... Ginny Nelson
The Underwater City (1962) .... Monica Powers
The Gallant Men (1963, TV series) .... Capt. Meg Thorpe
Arrest and Trial (1963, TV series) .... Eleanor
Perry Mason (1963, TV series) .... Patricia L. Kean / Janice Blake / Janice Barton / Valerie Comstock
Kraft Suspense Theatre (1964–1965, TV series) .... Joanne Clay / Ellen Yarnell
Tickle Me (1965) .... Vera Radford
Twelve O'Clock High (1965, TV series) .... Lt. Betty Russo
Burke's Law (1965, TV series) .... Carla Cabrial
The Long, Hot Summer (1965, TV series) .... Leona Mills
The Virginian (1966, TV series) .... Marian Clay
The Big Valley (1966–1967, TV series) .... Janet Masters / Edna Wesley
The Girl from U.N.C.L.E. (1967, TV series) .... Julia Douglas
Insight (1967, TV series) ....Jessica
Mannix (1967–1973, TV series) .... Edie Reynolds
Ironside (1968, TV series) .... Norma Howard
The Outsider (1968, TV series) .... Laura Carlvic
The Mod Squad (1968–1973, TV series) .... Nancy Ryan / Samantha Semple
My Friend Tony (1969, TV series)
General Hospital (1969, TV series) .... Denise Wilton
The F.B.I. (1969, TV series) .... Denise Kriton
The Doris Day Show (1969–1972, TV series) .... Louise Rusk / Karen Carruthers
Marcus Welby, M.D. (1969–1975, TV series) .... Lee Morgan / Claire Berwick
Dan August (1970, TV series) .... Patricia Fairley
The Bold Ones: The New Doctors (1970–1971, TV series) .... Lynn Craig
The Young Lawyers (1971, TV series) .... Alice Graham
The Last Movie (1971) .... Mrs. Anderson
The Trackers (1971, TV movie) .... Dora Paxton
The Jimmy Stewart Show (1971–1972, TV series) .... Martha Howard
Night Gallery (1972, TV series) .... Gay Melcor (segment "The Miracle at Camafeo")
Cannon (1972–1975, TV series)
Go Ask Alice (1973, TV movie) .... Dorothy
Search (1973, TV series) .... Jeanette Lewis
McQ (1974) .... Elaine
Lucas Tanner (1974, TV series) .... Mrs. Walker
Kolchak: The Night Stalker (1975, TV series) .... Mrs. Avery Walker
Caribe (1975, TV series) .... Mrs. Bladell
The Streets of San Francisco (1975, TV series) .... Judith
The Wild McCullochs (1975) .... Hannah McCulloch
Ellery Queen (1975, TV series) .... Jennifer Packard
Psychic Killer (1975) .... Dr. Laura Scott
Medical Center (1976, TV series) .... Ellie Wilke
Six Characters in Search of an Author (1976, TV movie) .... The Mother
The Killer Inside Me (1976) ..... Mother
McMillan & Wife (1977, TV series) .... Dorothy Wininger
This Is the Life (1977, TV series)
Quincy, M.E. (1977–1982, TV series) .... Dr. Chris Winston / Sharon Ross / Mrs. Daniels
Police Woman (1978, TV series) .... Eleanor Simpson
Goodbye, Franklin High (1978) .... Janice Armer
The Runaways (1978) .... Mother
The Incredible Hulk (1978, TV series) .... Ellen
The Fifth Floor (1978) .... Nurse Hannelord
Trapper John, M.D. (1980, TV series) .... Lorrie Malcolm
Vega$ (1981, TV series) .... Margaret Sorenson
Code Red (1981–1982, TV series) .... Ann Rorchek
Too Close for Comfort (1981–1984, TV series) .... Sylvia Walker
Cagney & Lacey (1982, TV series) ... Helen Granger
Capitol (1984–1986, TV series) .... Paula Denning
Champions (1984) .... Emma Hussey
Murder, She Wrote (1987–1993, TV series) .... Eve Simpson
Black Roses (1988) .... Mrs. Miller
Catchfire (1990) .... Martha
Beverly Hills, 90210 (1993, TV series) .... Grandma Beevis
Diagnosis: Murder (1997, TV series) .... Edie Reynolds Fallon
Melrose Place (1999, TV series) .... Mrs. Damarr
Sliders (1999, TV series) .... Old Maggie Beckett
Family Law (2000, TV series) .... Bonnie
Cold Case (2006, TV series) .... Dottie Mills
World Trade Center (2006) .... Allison's Grandmother
Lost (2006, Episode: "A Tale of Two Cities") .... Amelia
CSI: NY (2007, TV series) .... Betty Willens
Carnage (2011) .... Secretary (voice)

References

External links

Official site
Interview with Julie Adams, April 29, 2013, Classic Film & TV Cafe

1926 births
2019 deaths
20th-century American actresses
21st-century American actresses
Actresses from Arkansas
Actresses from Iowa
American television actresses
American film actresses
People from Blytheville, Arkansas
People from Waterloo, Iowa
Western (genre) television actors
Writers from Arkansas
Writers from Iowa